The Midland Combination Women's Football League, also known simply as the Midland Combination, was a women's football league in England from 1998 to 2014. Until the creation of the FA Women's Super League in 2011, that sat at the third level of English women's football pyramid along with the three other Combination Leagues – South West, South East and Northern. The Midland Combination fed into the FA Women's Premier League Northern Division, and lay above the West Midlands Regional Women's Football League and the East Midlands Regional Women's Football League in the pyramid. For the 2014–15 season the Midland Combination was incorporated into the newly re-structured FA Women's Premier League as the FA WPL Midlands Division One.

Clubs for 2013–14 season

Previous winners

References
History of the Midland Combination from midlandcombination.org. Retrieved 21 November 2006.

External links
Midland Women's Combination at FA Full Time Retrieved 17 September 2012.

4